The Well-Tuned Piano is an ongoing, improvisatory, solo piano work by composer La Monte Young. Begun in 1964, Young has never considered the composition or performance "finished", and he has performed incarnations of it several times since its debut in 1974. The composition utilizes a piano tuned in just intonation.

A typical performance lasts five to six hours. Young's wife, the artist Marian Zazeela, has contributed the lighting work The Magenta Lights to these performances. A 1987 performance of the piece was released on DVD in 2000. The Guardian described it as "one of the great achievements of 20th-century music."

Inspiration and influence
Young gives credit to Dennis Johnson, a former schoolmate and composer from UCLA, for inspiring The Well-Tuned Piano. Johnson wrote an extensive, improvisatory, solo piano piece titled November in 1959, a few years before Young began working on The Well-Tuned Piano. Although the piece is said to be as long as six hours, the tape recording made in 1962 cuts off suddenly after only an hour and a half.

Young has also been influential to many composers and musicians throughout his life. Dennis Johnson cites Young as an influence in his composition, The Second Machine, which is based on four single pitches of Young's Four Dreams of China. Composer and critic Kyle Gann has said that The Well-Tuned Piano, "may well be the most important American piano work since Charles Ives's Concord Sonata, in size, in influence, and in revolutionary innovation". Gann has also called the piece "the most important piano work of the late 20th century." In his book, Four Musical Minimalists, Keith Potter states that The Well-Tuned Piano is significant, "in the contexts of musical minimalism, of musics working at the interface between composition and improvisation, and of twentieth-century music for solo piano".

Music

Tuning

La Monte Young's piano tuning is an essential aspect of The Well-Tuned Piano. Young dates the piece as "1964–73–81–Present" to indicate the work's development through its tunings, where in E was retuned in 1973, and C and G were retuned in 1981. Young had kept the tuning a secret until 1993, when he allowed Kyle Gann to publish the details.

Young has always performed The Well-Tuned Piano on an Imperial Bösendorfer piano, which is larger than a standard acoustic grand piano, spanning eight complete octaves, with nine notes extending the bass of the piano. Young describes the pitches of his tuning as being, "derived from various partials of the overtone series of an inferred low fundamental E-flat reference ten octaves below the lowest E-flat on the Bösendorfer Imperial".

As explained by Kyle Gann, Young's system uses 7-limit tuning, a just intonation system where every pitch class in the scale is constructed from a previously constructed pitch by taking only up to the seventh pitch from its overtone series or undertone series. Young cites a distaste for the fifth harmonic, so Young uses only overtone and undertone numbers 2, 3, 4, 6, and 7 in the construction of his scale. A consequence to this is that the ratio between the frequencies of any two pitches is a rational number whose numerator and denominator have prime factors consisting only of 2, 3, and 7. Factors of 2 correspond to octave shifts, so in tuning theory ratios are normalized to lie within the octave 1/1–2/1 by multiplying or dividing through by powers of 2.

All of the pitches in Young's scale can be placed in a two-dimensional grid, where pitches on the horizontal axis are related by a 3/2 ratio (a perfect fifth) and pitches on the vertical axis are related by a 7/4 ratio (a harmonic seventh). This collection of 12 pitches is then assigned to the keys of a standard piano keyboard in such a way that pitches with a 3/2 ratio tend to span 8 keys, which in standard piano tuning forms a perfect fifth. Each octave of the piano follows the same sequence of intervals. The following table shows the grid along with the assignment to piano keys:

The A key on the piano is tuned to A440, and the rest of the keys are tuned relative to this. This puts Young's Eb key 74.69 cents flatter than the Eb in equal temperament with the same A. It should be stressed that the key names are not meant to be tunings of the standard pitch names, and they are merely assignments of pitches to conveniently located piano keys. Some pitches, for example G and G, are acoustically in reverse order.

The primary consonant intervals in Young's scale are:

In 12-TET, all intervals, when measured in cents, are a multiple of 100. According to Kyle Gann, when listening to The Well-Tuned Piano "you spend the first four hours becoming familiar with the cozy septimal minor third, the expansive septimal major third, and by the fifth hour you can hardly remember that intervals had ever been any other sizes." In 5-limit tuning, the major third is usually a 5/4 ratio, which at 386.31 cents is closer to a 12-TET 400 cent major third than the 9/7 septimal major third at 435.08 cents. As another point for comparison, in three-limit tuning the Pythagorean major third is an 81/64 ratio, which is 407.8 cents.

A tuning is a choice of pitches in a scale, which lets one judge the intonation of pitches, and a temperament is a tuning where compromises are made to an ideal tuning (like just intonation) to meet other requirements, such as being able to use any pitch as the tonal center for Western harmonic practice. Bach's The Well-Tempered Clavier took full advantage of the development of a temperament where all 24 major and minor scales were reasonably usable. In contrast, Young's The Well-Tuned Piano is organized around certain fixed non-transposable sets of pitches that function as scales, such as the Magic Chord. While just intonation eliminates rough beating between the harmonics of two pitches, the trade-off is the loss of general transposability to other tonal centers due to 2, 3, and 7 being coprime and pianos having a physical limit to the number of keys per octave.

Form
The Well-Tuned Piano, being improvisatory in nature, as well as ever-changing, has no specific form. The closest a listener can come to understanding the structure of Young's piece is by studying the liner notes from the 1981 Gramavision recording. Within the liner notes, Young breaks the performance into seven major sections and further deconstructs each of those sections into multiple subsections. The sections and subsections are not notated or described, but simply listed along with the duration of each section so a listener can easily follow along. The seven major sections are as follows:

Opening Chord (00:00:00–00:21:47)
Magic Chord (00:21:47–01:02:29)
Magic Opening Chord (01:02:29–1:23:54)
Magic Harmonic Rainforest Chord (1:23:54–03:05:31)
Romantic Chord (03:05:31–04:01:25)
Elysian Fields (04:01:25–04:59:41)
Ending (04:59:41–05:01:22)

The subsections are often called themes, and each is vastly and descriptively labeled. A few examples are "The Flying Carpet", which belongs in The Romantic Chord section, and "Sunshine in The Old Country", which is found in The Magic Opening Chord section. Each theme is made up of a specific, unique combination of pitches. However the smaller themes found in one larger section will often have many pitches in common.

Performance history
Young gave the world premiere of The Well-Tuned Piano in Rome in 1974, ten years after the creation of the piece. Previously, Young had presented it as a recorded work. In 1975, Young premiered it in New York with eleven live performances during the months of April and May. As of October 25, 1981, the date of the Gramavision recording of The Well-Tuned Piano, Young had performed the piece 55 times. The only other person to ever perform the piece besides Young is his disciple, composer and pianist Michael Harrison. Young taught Harrison the piece, which not only allowed him to perform it, but also to aid in tuning and preparing the piano for performances. In 1987, Young performed the piece again as part of a larger concert series that included many more of his works. This performance, on May 10, 1987, was videotaped and released on DVD in 2000 on Young's label, Just Dreams.

Each realization is a separately titled and independent composition, with over 60 realizations to date. World première: Rome 1974. American première: New York 1975. Chords from The Well-Tuned Piano (1981–present), are presented as sound environments. Includes: The Opening Chord (1981), The Magic Chord (1984), The Magic Opening Chord (1984);

Reviews

On 3 January 2016, the 25 October 1981 Gramavision recording of The Well-Tuned Piano was broadcast on BBC Radio 3 (followed by excerpts of other Young compositions and collaborations) between 1am and 7am (GMT).

Recordings
1981 Performance CDs La Monte Young, The Well-Tuned Piano: 81 X 25 (6:17:50–11:18:59 PM NYC), by La Monte Young, Gramavision 18-8701-2, 1987, five compact discs.
1987 Performance DVD La Monte Young, Marian Zazeela, The Well-Tuned Piano in The Magenta Lights (87 V 10 6:43:00 PM – 87 V 11 1:07:45 AM NYC), DVD, produced by La Monte Young and Marian Zazeela (New York: Just Dreams Inc., 2000).

References

Sources

Further reading
Doty, David B. "The La Monte Young Interview: Part Two." The Quarterly Journal of the Just Intonation Network 6, no. 1 (1990): 8–12.
Young, La Monte and Marian Zazeela. The Well-Tuned Piano in The Magenta Lights 87 V 10 6:43:00 PM – 87 V 11 1:07:45 AM NYC. DVD. Produced by La Monte Young and Marian Zazeela. New York: Just Dreams, 2000.

External links
"The Well-Tuned Piano 81 X 25". MelaFoundation.org.
Brown, Kevin Macneil (2011). "Heart of Sound and Light: La Monte Young and Marian Zazeela's The Well-Tuned Piano In The Magenta Lights". DustedMagazine.com.

Compositions by La Monte Young
1964 compositions
La Monte Young albums
7-limit tuning and intervals
Compositions in just intonation
Piano compositions in the 20th century
Compositions for solo piano
Unfinished musical compositions